Just the Wind is a 2012 Hungarian drama film directed by Benedek Fliegauf. The film competed in competition at the 62nd Berlin International Film Festival, where it won the Jury Grand Prix. The film was selected as the Hungarian entry for the Best Foreign Language Oscar at the 85th Academy Awards, but it did not make the final shortlist.

It is based on an actual series of killings in Hungary. The plot however is fiction and focuses on a Romany family living close by.

Cast
 Lajos Sárkány as Rio
 Katalin Toldi as Mari
 Gyöngyi Lendvai as Anna
 György Toldi

See also
 List of submissions to the 85th Academy Awards for Best Foreign Language Film
 List of Hungarian submissions for the Academy Award for Best Foreign Language Film

References

External links
 

2012 films
2012 drama films
Hungarian drama films
2010s Hungarian-language films
Silver Bear Grand Jury Prize winners